The 2015–16 Ligue 1 season is the top level of football competition in Niger. It began on 25 December 2015 and concluded on 1 August 2016.

Standings
  1.AS FAN (Niamey)                   26  18  7  1  56-11  61  Champions
  2.Sahel SC (Niamey)                 26  14  6  6  38-25  48
  3.AS GNN (Niamey)                   26  13  7  6  44-20  46
  4.AS Douanes (Niamey)               26  13  6  7  39-18  45
  5.US Gendarmerie Nationale (Niamey) 26   9 13  4  38-25  40
  6.Akokana FC (Arlit)                26  10  8  8  33-27  38
  7.ASN NIGELEC (Niamey)              26  10  8  8  35-31  38
  8.AS SONIDEP (Niamey)               26   8 11  7  25-20  35
  9.Urana FC (Arlit)                  26   6 11  9  24-29  29
 10.AS Police (Niamey)                26   7  8 11  17-25  29
 11.Olympic FC (Niamey)               26   6  7 13  22-39  25
 12.Tagour Provincial Club (Dosso)    26   7  4 15  20-58  25
 ------------------------------------------------------------
 13.Espoir FC (Zinder)                26   5  5 16  17-48  20  Relegation Playoff
 ------------------------------------------------------------
 14.Dan Kassawa FC (Maradi)           26   3  5 18  17-49  14  Relegated

References

Super Ligue (Niger) seasons
Premier League
Premier League
Niger